Storozhevaya is a rural locality (a settlement) in Krasnovishersky District, Perm Krai, Russia. The population was 20 as of 2010.

Geography 
Storozhevaya is located 15 km northeast of Krasnovishersk (the district's administrative centre) by road. Visherogorsk is the nearest rural locality.

References 

Rural localities in Krasnovishersky District